St Oswald's Church is an Anglican church in Preesall, a town on the Fylde coastal plain in Lancashire, England. It is an active parish church in the diocese of Blackburn and the archdeaconry of Lancaster. It was built 1896–1898, designed by Hubert Austin, and is recorded in the National Heritage List for England as a designated Grade II listed building.

History and administration
St Oswald's was designed by Hubert Austin of the Lancaster architectural firm Austin and Paley in 1896, and building of the church was completed in 1899. Austin's signed architectural plans for the building hang inside the church. It was originally a chapel of ease to St James' Church at nearby Stalmine. The church cost about £3,450.

St Oswald's was designated a Grade II listed building on 3 October 1984. The Grade II listing, the lowest of the three grades, is for buildings that are "nationally important and of special interest". An active church in the Church of England, St Oswald's is part of the diocese of Blackburn, which is in the Province of York. It is in the archdeaconry of Lancaster, the Deanery of Garstang and the benefice of the Waterside Parishes of Hambleton, Out Rawcliffe and Preesall.

Architecture
The church is constructed of red brick with sandstone dressings; the roofs are slate. The church plan consists of a nave and chancel, with a south aisle, transepts and bell turret (covered in shingles and with a short spire) towards the west end.  There is a porch to the south. The windows are two-light, pointed headed, with quatrefoils. There is a three-light west window and a four-light east window with cusped ogees.

The internal walls of the nave are of red brick, and the chancel is faced with Runcorn sandstone. The four-bay aisle has octagonal arcade piers. Stained glass in the church includes work from the 1970s by J. Fisher and H. Harvey of Shrigley and Hunt.

See also

Listed buildings in Preesall
List of ecclesiastical works by Austin and Paley (1895–1914)

References

Citations

Sources

 

Church of England church buildings in Lancashire
Diocese of Blackburn
Grade II listed churches in Lancashire
The Fylde
Oswald, Preesall
Austin and Paley buildings